Makurap (Macurapi) is a Tupian language of Brazil.

References

Tupian languages
Mamoré–Guaporé linguistic area